Malek Jaziri was the defending champion but chose not to defend his title.

Corentin Moutet won the title after defeating Quentin Halys 6–3, 6–4 in the final.

Seeds

Draw

Finals

Top half

Bottom half

References
Main Draw
Qualifying Draw

Amex-Istanbul Challenger - Singles
2018 Singles